North Carolina's 52nd House district is one of 120 districts in the North Carolina House of Representatives. It has been represented by Republican Ben Moss since 2023.

Geography
Since 2023, the district has included all of Richmond County, as well as part of Moore County. The district overlaps with the 21st and 29th Senate districts.

District officeholders

Multi-member district

Single-member district

Election results

2022

2020

2018

2016

2014

2012

2010

2008

2006

2004

2002

2000

References

North Carolina House districts
Richmond County, North Carolina
Moore County, North Carolina